The 16th Dáil was elected at the 1957 general election on 5 March 1957 and met on 20 March 1957. The members of Dáil Éireann, the house of representatives of the Oireachtas (legislature) of Ireland, are known as TDs. The 16th Dáil saw a change of Taoiseach from Éamon de Valera to Seán Lemass in June 1959. On 8 September 1961 President Éamon de Valera dissolved the Dáil on the request of Taoiseach Seán Lemass. The 16th Dáil lasted  days.

Composition of the 16th Dáil

In line with its policy of abstentionism, the Sinn Féin TDs did not take their seats.

Fianna Fáil, denoted with a bullet, formed the 8th Government of Ireland led by Éamon de Valera as Taoiseach. Following de Valera's election as president of Ireland in June 1959, Seán Lemass formed the 9th Government of Ireland.

Graphical representation
This is a graphical comparison of party strengths in the 16th Dáil from March 1957. This was not the official seating plan.

Ceann Comhairle
On the meeting of the Dáil, Patrick Hogan (Lab), who had served as Ceann Comhairle since 1951, was proposed by John A. Costello (FG) and seconded by Éamon de Valera (FF) for the position. His election was approved without a vote.

TDs by constituency
The list of the 147 TDs elected, is given in alphabetical order by Dáil constituency.

Changes

See also
Members of the 9th Seanad

References

External links
Houses of the Oireachtas: Debates: 16th Dáil

 
16
16th Dáil